Jackie Blue is a New Zealand politician.

Jackie Blue may also refer to:

"Jackie Blue" (song), a 1974 song by the Ozark Mountain Daredevils
 Jackie Blue (album), a 1996 album by the same band